The Rural Municipality of Roblin is a former rural municipality (RM) in the Canadian province of Manitoba. It was originally incorporated as a rural municipality on November 15, 1902. It ceased on January 1, 2015 as a result of its provincially mandated amalgamation with the Village of Cartwright to form the Cartwright – Roblin Municipality.

The former RM is located in the Pembina Valley Region of the province along the border of the state of North Dakota in the United States of America. According to the Canada 2006 Census, the former RM had a population of 964.

Geography 
According to Statistics Canada, the former RM had an area of 716.15 km2 (276.51 sq mi).

Communities 
Cartwright
Mather

Adjacent municipalities 
Rural Municipality of Turtle Mountain - (west)
Rural Municipality of Strathcona - (northwest)
Rural Municipality of Argyle - (north)
Rural Municipality of Louise - (east)
Towner County, North Dakota - (south)

See also 
Municipality of Roblin

References

External links 

Roblin
Populated places disestablished in 2015
2015 disestablishments in Manitoba